Andrew Ryan Stokesbary (born 1985) is an American lawyer and politician. He serves in the Washington House of Representatives, where he is currently the ranking Republican member on the House Appropriations Committee. During his second term, he was elected Minority Floor Leader. He also sits on the House Finance Committee.

Stokesbary was first elected in 2014, defeating Democrat Mike Sando. He previously worked as an aide to Pete von Reichbauer, a King County councilmember.

In 2019, Stokesbary introduced legislation that would permit NCAA athletes enrolled at Washington colleges to receive compensation. Similar bills were subsequently filed in California and Colorado, and by Congressman Mark Walker (R-NC).

Stokesbary reportedly considered running for Governor of Washington in 2020.

Personal life
Stokesbary lives with his wife and two sons in Auburn. He is a graduate of Duke University, where he was the Blue Devil mascot, and Notre Dame Law School. Outside of the Legislature, he works as a lawyer for startups and emerging companies and sits on the board of the Auburn Valley YMCA.

Electoral history

References

Living people
People from Olympia, Washington
People from Auburn, Washington
Washington (state) lawyers
Republican Party members of the Washington House of Representatives
21st-century American politicians
1985 births